Procitheronia is a genus of moths in the family Saturniidae first described by Charles Duncan Michener in 1949.

Species
Procitheronia fenestrata (W. Rothschild, 1907)
Procitheronia principalis (Walker, 1855)
Procitheronia purpurea (Oiticica, 1930)

References

Ceratocampinae